Ng Ser Miang,  (born 6 April 1949) is a Singaporean entrepreneur, diplomat, and retired sailor. He founded Trans-Island Bus Services (now known as SMRT Buses) in 1982 and is a board member of Singapore Press Holdings. Since 1990, he has been the vice-president of the Singapore National Olympic Council, and since 2009, has served as a vice-president of the International Olympic Committee. In 2013, he was a candidate for the presidency of the International Olympic Committee, but eventually lost to Thomas Bach.

Early life
Ng Ser Miang was born in 1949 in Swatow, China; his family moved to Singapore the same year. He studied at the Serangoon Garden Government High School (now Serangoon Garden Secondary School and Dunman Government High School (now Dunman High School). While in high school, Ng was a Boy Scout troop leader and head prefect. During this time he also travelled to the United States for nine months with an American Field Service scholarship. While in the US Ng first developed an interest in sailing and learned the sport.

After high school, Ng studied business administration at the University of Singapore (now the National University of Singapore) and graduated in 1971 with honours. While at university, in 1969, Ng won a silver medal at the Southeast Asian Peninsular Games as a part of the Singapore sailing team. Following his graduation, he completed his national service.

Career
In 1973, Ng entered the business world, working as a bank officer at the Chung Khiaw Bank. Three years later, he became the managing director of Singapore Shuttle Bus, a City Shuttle Service operator. To create competition for the Singapore Bus Service, the only bus service in Singapore at the time, Ng started the Trans-Island Bus Services (TIBS) in 1982 and acted as the company's managing director. As a result of his work with TIBS and Singapore Shuttle Bus, Ng was named Singapore's Outstanding Manager of the Year in 1993. In 2001, TIBS was purchased by SMRT Corporation and later rebranded SMRT Buses. Ng retired from the company after overseeing the sale.

In 2005, Ng took over as non-executive chairman of NTUC FairPrice, Singapore's largest supermarket chain, which is known for its philanthropy work within Singapore. In addition to these roles, Ng has been a board member of Singapore Press Holdings since 2007 and of WBL Corporation from 2005 to 2012.

Throughout his career, Ng has held a number of leadership and advisory roles in Singapore's business community. He served as President of the Automobile Association of Singapore from 1988 to 1996. In 1992, he became a faculty fellow of Business Administration in the School of Postgraduate Management Studies at the National University of Singapore. The next year, he became a member of the Trade Development Board of the China Business Information Advisory Group as well as a member of the Advisory Board of the Entrepreneurship Development Center at Nanyang Technological University.

Sports and Olympics roles
Through his interest in sailing, Ng became involved with several sailing and sports councils, including acting as President of the Singapore Yachting Association in the early 1990s and later being elected as vice-president of the International Sailing Federation in 1994, a role he held for four years.

From 1991 to 2002, he was chairman of the Singapore Sports Council (SSC). While serving as the SSC chairman, Ng helped launch the Sports for Life programme to promote sports for Singaporeans of all ages, and the Sports Excellence programme which directed national resources to supporting athletes in competitive sports. During Ng's tenure, the Singaporean government spent Singapore $500 million in supporting the different programmes.

Ng's involvement with the Olympic Movement began with roles in the local Olympic council. He was elected as vice-president of the Singapore National Olympic Council in 1990. In 1993, Ng became chairman of the Singapore Olympic Academy. He initiated and acted as chairman of Project 0812, an organisation that provided Singaporean athletes with high-level training and preparation to win medals in the Beijing and London Olympics. Through his efforts with Project 0812, Singapore received its first Olympic medal in 48 years at the 2008 Beijing Olympic Games.

In 2005, after being the first Asian elected to the International Olympic Committee Executive Board, Ng served as President of the 117th IOC Session Organising Committee which took place in Singapore. He has also held a seat on the IOC audit and finance commissions, and was on the Coordination Commissions for the 2008 Beijing and the 2012 London Olympics.

In 2009, Ng was elected a vice-president of the IOC, a position which he still held . That same year, Ng also served as chairman of the inaugural Asian Youth Games Steering Committee. In 2010, Ng served chairman of the inaugural Singapore Youth Olympic Games Organising Committee. Two years later, he helped organise the Singapore Youth Olympic Festival, an annual event that exposes youth to the Olympic spirit. He also currently serves as chairman of the Singapore Olympic Foundation. Ng declared his candidacy to become the next president of the International Olympic Committee in May 2013 at the Sorbonne in Paris.

In 2014 Ng was named president of the Fundación Valencia CF.

Public service
In 1995, Ng and other former members of The Singapore Scout Association formed the Singapore Scout Guild. The organisation was established to serve as role models to current scouts and to demonstrate that former scouts go on to lead successful lives.

From its inception in 2001, Ng became chairman of Network China, an organisation created to assist companies in Singapore to network and find business opportunities in China. Also beginning in 2001, Ng served on the Asia Pacific Economic Cooperation Business Advisory Council. He held this position until 2008.

Ng has represented Singapore as a non-resident Ambassador to Norway since 2001 and was also a non-resident Ambassador to Hungary from 2000 to 2012. He has served as a Justice of the Peace in Singapore since 2005. Previously, he served as a Nominated Member of Parliament from 2002 to 2005.

Awards and recognition
In 1993, Ng was named Singapore's Outstanding Manager of the Year for his work with the Trans-Island Bus Service. In 2012 he was awarded the Order of Merit of the Republic of Hungary after his time as Singapore's non-resident Ambassador to Hungary. He has also received a Distinguished Service Award from the United States Sports Academy. From the IOC Ng has received the Centennial Olympic Games Trophy in 1996 and the Sports and the Community Trophy in 2006. The Singaporean government awarded Ng with the Public Service Star in 1999 and the Meritorious Service Medal in 2005.

Personal life
Ng has two daughters and a son with late wife Ko Ai Choo. Elder daughter Xuan Hui is a former national sailor, three-time Singapore National Olympic Council Sportsgirl of the Year, and gold medalist at the 1991 and 1993 Southeast Asian Games.

References

Living people
1949 births
International Olympic Committee members
Singaporean people of Teochew descent
Singaporean diplomats
Ambassadors of Singapore to Norway
Ambassadors of Singapore to Hungary
Presidents of the Organising Committees for the Olympic Games
University of Singapore alumni
People from Shantou
Chinese Civil War refugees
Chinese emigrants to Singapore
Singaporean trade unionists
Dunman High School alumni
Recipients of the Bintang Bakti Masyarakat